In noncommutative geometry, a Fredholm module is a mathematical structure used to quantize the differential calculus.

Definition
If A is an involutive algebra over the complex numbers C, then a Fredholm module over A consists of 
an involutive representation of A on a Hilbert space H, together with a self-adjoint operator F, of square 1 and such that the commutator

[F, a] 

is a compact operator, for all a in A.

References
The paper by Atiyah is reprinted in volume 3 of his collected works,

External link
Fredholm module, on PlanetMath

Noncommutative geometry
Mathematical quantization